Living with the Past is a live album by Jethro Tull. The first half (first LP of the 2019 vinyl reissue) contains material from the Hammersmith Apollo performance on 25 November 2001 and features songs from different eras of Tull's history as well as some pieces from Ian Anderson's solo albums: "The Habanero Reel", "The Water Carrier" (DVD only) from The Secret Language of Birds and the instrumental "In the Grip of Stronger Stuff" from Divinities: Twelve Dances with God. Aside from "Cheerio" (the conclusion from the Hammersmith concert), other recordings are collected in the second half.

The CD and DVD both include large chunks of the Hammersmith concert, but the selection is not identical: "The Habanero Reel" and "In the Grip of Stronger Stuff" only appear on the CD, while "Cross-Eyed Mary", "Thick as a Brick", "Beside Myself" (bonus track), "Hunt by Numbers", "Bourée", "The Water Carrier", "A New Day Yesterday", "Budapest" and "New Jig" are all exclusive to the DVD. Also played at the gig, but available on neither format, are "Set-Aside" (another Anderson solo track) and "Pibroch (Cap in Hand)".

Some of the additional recordings such as the acoustic session also appear in both formats. The DVD has some video effects overlaid on top of the performances, sometimes also mixing in footage from open air concerts (combined with the audio from the Hammersmith Apollo).

Track listing (CD)
 Intro – 0:22
 "My Sunday Feeling" – 4:00
 "Roots to Branches" – 5:34
 "Jack in the Green" – 2:40
 "The Habanero Reel" – 4:03
 "Sweet Dream" – 4:54
 "In the Grip of Stronger Stuff" (Instrumental) – 2:57
 "Aqualung" – 8:20
 "Locomotive Breath" – 5:26
 "Living in the Past" – 3:27
 "Protect and Survive" (Instrumental) – 1:01
 "Nothing Is Easy" – 5:16
 "Wond'ring Aloud" – 1:54
 "Life Is a Long Song" – 3:32
 "A Christmas Song" – 3:05
 "Cheap Day Return" – 1:12
 "Mother Goose" – 1:57
 "Dot Com" – 4:28
 "Fat Man" – 5:06
 "Some Day the Sun Won't Shine for You" – 4:13
 "Cheerio" – 1:36

Track listing (DVD) 

 My Sunday Feeling
 Cross Eyed Mary
 Roots to Branches
 Someday the Sun Won't Shine for You (Class of '68 reunion)
 Jack in the Green
 Thick as a Brick
 Wond'ring Aloud (acoustic session)
 Sweet Dream
 Hunt by Numbers
 Bourée
 A Song for Jeffrey
 The Water Carrier
 A New Day Yesterday
 Life is a Long Song (acoustic session)
 Budapest
 New Jig
 Aqualung
 Locomotive Breath
 Living in the Past
 Protect and Survive
 Cheerio

Extra features

 John Barleycorn (Fairport Convention featuring Ian Anderson, filmed at the Cropredy Festival August 2001)
 Blind Eye (Uriah Heep featuring Ian Anderson, filmed at the Mermaid Theatre, London, December 2000)
 Photo Gallery
 Tull Talk
 Out takes
 DVT (advert warning of the dangers of Deep Vein Thrombosis, starring Ian Anderson)
 My Sunday Feeling (original line-up Class of '68 reunion)
 Beside Myself (Virtual Ticket Window - filmed at Hammersmith; three different viewing angles available)

Personnel
Jethro Tull
 Ian Anderson – concert and bamboo flutes, vocals, acoustic guitar, harmonica, mandolin (plays on all tracks)
 Martin Barre – electric guitar, acoustic guitar, flute on track 19 (plays on tracks 1 – 14, 18 – 19 and 21)
 Andrew Giddings – keyboards, accordion (plays on tracks 1 – 14, 18 – 19 and 21)
 Jonathan Noyce – bass (plays on tracks 1 – 14, 18 – 19 and 21)
 Dave Pegg – mandolin, bass (plays on tracks 15 – 17)
 Doane Perry – drums, percussion (plays on tracks 1 – 14, 18 – 19 and 21)
 Mick Abrahams – electric guitar, acoustic guitar, vocals (plays on track 20)
 Glenn Cornick – bass (plays on track 20)
 Clive Bunker – drums (plays on track 20)

Guest musicians
 James Duncan – drums on track 14
 Brian Thomas – violin on tracks 13 – 14
 Justine Tomlinson – violin on tracks 13 – 14
 Malcolm Henderson – viola on tracks 13 – 14
 Juliet Tomlinson – cello on tracks 13 – 14

Certifications

See also 
 Living in the Past  (1972)
 Nothing Is Easy: Live at the Isle of Wight 1970 (2004)
 Ian Anderson Plays the Orchestral Jethro Tull (2005)
 Aqualung Live (2005)
 Live at Madison Square Garden 1978 (2009)

Notes 
 US release was originally scheduled for 23 April 2002, but was delayed a week
 UK CD release 6 May 2002
 German CD release 13 May 2002
 US DVD release 14 May 2002
 Tracks 1 - 11 and 21 recorded at Hammersmith Apollo London 25 November 2001
 Track 12 recorded at L'Olympia Paris France 22 October 1999
 Tracks 13 and 14 recorded at a stately home January 2002
 Tracks 15 - 17 recorded in the dressing room of Hallenstadion Zurich Switzerland 13 October 1989
 Tracks 18 and 19 recorded for 2 Meter Sessions RTL Holland at Wisseloord Studios, Hilversum, Netherlands 19 October 1999
 Track 20 recorded at Kellys, Leamington Spa, England 29 January 2002

References

External links 
 Living with the Past (DVD) at Allmovie
 
 Living with the Past (DVD) at Progressive World
 Living with the Past (CD) at Progressive World
 Jethro Tull 2002 Schedule

Jethro Tull (band) video albums
Jethro Tull (band) live albums
2002 video albums
2002 live albums
Live video albums